XEWR-AM (1110 kHz) is a non-commercial daytimer radio station in Ciudad Juárez, Chihuahua. It is known as Cristo Rey (Christ the King) with a Catholic radio format programmed by the Roman Catholic Diocese of Ciudad Juárez.  Because AM 1110 is a clear channel frequency, XEWR signs off the air at night, when radio waves travel farther.

History
XEWR received its first concession on May 21, 1959. It was the founding station of what is today known as MegaRadio. The concessionaire has remained the same throughout XEWR's history.

In January 2008, XEWR flipped to its current Catholic religious format. It had previously been an English-language oldies station, Classic 1110.

References

Radio stations in Chihuahua
Radio stations established in 1959
Daytime-only radio stations in Mexico